Events in the year 2018 in Algeria.

Incumbents
 President: Abdelaziz Bouteflika
 Prime Minister: Ahmed Ouyahia

Events

11 April – the 2018 Algerian Air Force Il-76 crash: An Algerian military transport aircraft crashed shortly after take-off from Boufarik Airport. All 257 people on board were killed, making the accident the deadliest air crash in Algeria.
 October –  Prime Minister Ahmed Ouyahia announced that Algeria would ban the burka at the Workplace.

Deaths

7 July – Hacène Lalmas, footballer (b. 1943).
11 July –Abdelkhader Houamel, painter (b. 1936).
15 August – Abu Bakr al-Jazaeri, Islamic scholar and writer (b. 1921).
16 August – Mohamed Demagh, sculptor (b. 1930).
12 September – Rachid Taha, singer (b. 1958).
20 September – Mohamed Sahnoun, diplomat (b. 1931).
14 October – Ahmed Boustila, military officer (b. 1944).
28 December – Abdelmalek Benhabyles, politician (b. 1921).

References

External link

 
2010s in Algeria 
Years of the 21st century in Algeria 
Algeria 
Algeria